ZN or Zn may refer to:

Science and technology
 Zinc, symbol Zn, a chemical element
 Azimuth, the angle between a reference plane and a point
 Zontanoi Nekroi, Greek hip hop group
 Zenith, the direction pointing directly above a particular location
 Zettanewton (ZN), an SI unit of force
 Ziehl–Neelsen stain, a special bacteriological stain used to identify acid-fast organisms
 Zn, a cyclic group
 ℤn, the ring of integers modulo n (modular arithmetic)

Other uses
 Air Bourbon (IATA airline designator)